ADQ may refer to:

 Abductor digiti quinti (disambiguation)
 Action démocratique du Québec, defunct political party in Quebec, Canada
 American Dairy Queen Corporation, American franchiser of Dairy Queen restaurants
 Dangme language, a Kwa language of Ghana
 Kodiak Airport, Kodiak, Alaska, United States
 Average daily quantity, a measure of drug consumption similar to defined daily dose
 Average delay in queue, a measure of queuing delay